Aydin Ali oglu Ibrahimov (17 September 1938 – 2 September 2021) was an Azerbaijani wrestler.

Biography
He competed for the Soviet Union at the 1964 Summer Olympics.

Ibrahimov died of COVID-19 on 2 September 2021, in Baku.

References

External links
 

1938 births
2021 deaths
Olympic wrestlers of the Soviet Union
Wrestlers at the 1964 Summer Olympics
Azerbaijani male sport wrestlers
Olympic bronze medalists for the Soviet Union
Olympic medalists in wrestling
Sportspeople from Ganja, Azerbaijan
World Wrestling Champions
Medalists at the 1964 Summer Olympics
European Wrestling Championships medalists
Deaths from the COVID-19 pandemic in Azerbaijan